Imperial Violets (French:Violettes impériales; German:Die Veilchen der Kaiserin) is a 1932 French historical film directed by Henry Roussel and starring Raquel Meller, Suzanne Bianchetti and Georges Péclet. It is a remake of the 1924 silent film of the same title.

The film's sets were designed by the art directors René Decrais and Robert Gys.

Cast
 Raquel Meller as Violetta  
 Suzanne Bianchetti as Eugénie de Montijo
 Georges Péclet as Pierre de Saint-Affremont  
 Émile Drain as Napoleon III
 Paule Andral as Madame de Montijo  
 Carlotta Conti as Madame de Berry-Fronsac  
 Marguerite Charles as La maréchale de Mondovi  
 Jeannette Marcy as Mademoiselle Adélaïde  
 Louisa de Mornand as Madame de la Tour-Maignan  
 Robert Dartois as Le duc de Morny  
 Victor Vina as Professeur Fourras  
 Carlos San Martín as Le marquis Carlos Lopez Vega Santianos  
 Jean Reyma as Raoul  
 Fernand Mailly as L'évêque 
 Jeanne de Carol
 Suzy Delair 
 Myane Destrem
 Jean Guilton 
 Pierre Gérald 
 Made Sylvere

International Release
The film was released in the United States in 1935 as La Violetera, with Spanish, rather than English, subtitles.

See also
 Imperial Violets (1924)
 Imperial Violets (1952)

References

Bibliography 
 Dayna Oscherwitz & MaryEllen Higgins. The A to Z of French Cinema. Scarecrow Press, 2009.

External links 
 

1932 films
French historical films
1930s historical films
1930s French-language films
Films set in Paris
Films set in Seville
Films set in the 1850s
Remakes of French films
Sound film remakes of silent films
Films directed by Henry Roussel
French black-and-white films
Cultural depictions of Napoleon III
1930s French films